Cornelis Hendrik Boudewijn Boot (15 September 1813, in Arnhem – 5 November 1892, in The Hague) was a Dutch politician.

1813 births
1892 deaths
19th-century Dutch lawyers
Ministers of Justice of the Netherlands
People from Arnhem
Leiden University alumni
Mayors of Amsterdam
Commanders of the Order of the Netherlands Lion
19th-century Dutch politicians